Mohamed El Bouazzati (born 9 January 1997) is a German-Moroccan footballer who plays for Bezirksliga club FC Roj Dortmund. He plays as a center back.

Club career 

Born in Nador, Morocco and having grown up in Dortmund, El Bouazzati played for Borussia Dortmund in his youth. He made his professional debut for Borussia Dortmund II in the 3. Liga on 22 August 2014 against SG Sonnenhof Großaspach, replacing Nico Knystock after 87 minutes of a scoreless draw.

On 5 July 2022, El Bouazzati joined Bezirksliga club FC Roj Dortmund.

International career
El Bouazzati has represented the Morocco national football team at international level, making two appearances for their under-17 team in October 2013.

References

External links
Mohamed El Bouazzati at FuPa

1997 births
Living people
German footballers
Moroccan footballers
German people of Moroccan descent
People from Nador
Borussia Dortmund II players
VfL Osnabrück players
FC Zorya Luhansk players
SG Wattenscheid 09 players
Rot Weiss Ahlen players
3. Liga players
Regionalliga players
Ukrainian Premier League players
Association football defenders
Moroccan expatriate footballers
Moroccan expatriate sportspeople in Ukraine
Expatriate footballers in Ukraine
SV Lippstadt 08 players
SC Westfalia Herne players
Oberliga (football) players